Orlando Garrido may refer to:

 Orlando H. Garrido (born 1931), Cuban biologist and tennis player
 Orlando Garrido (weightlifter) (1924–2015), Cuban Olympic weightlifter